Lukáš Říha (born March 20, 1981) is a Czech professional ice hockey player who plays in Poland with TH Unia Oświęcim. He previously played in the Slovak Extraliga with MHC Martin, and has also played 131 games in the Czech Extraliga.

References

External links

Living people
MHC Martin players
Czech ice hockey forwards
1981 births
People from Litvínov
TH Unia Oświęcim players
Sportspeople from the Ústí nad Labem Region
Czech expatriate sportspeople in Poland
Expatriate ice hockey players in Poland
Czech expatriate ice hockey players in Slovakia